Rock Pile Point is the east point of Bermel Peninsula on the Bowman Coast, Graham Land. This feature was photographed from the air and roughly positioned by United States Antarctic Service (USAS), 1939–41, which applied the descriptive name Rock Pile Point to the peninsula; the name was subsequently reapplied by Advisory Committee on Antarctic Names (US-ACAN) to the east point as described.
 

Headlands of Graham Land
Bowman Coast